General Major Georg Weiner was a German flying ace during World War I, being credited with nine aerial victories. He would continue in Germany's military service, rising to the rank of Generalmajor during World War II.

Early life
Georg Weiner was born in Dresden, Germany, on 22 August 1895. He joined the German Army early in World War I, on 22 August 1914.

World War I

Promotions and appointments
22 November 1914: Enlisted as a Gefreiter

14 January 1915: Promoted to Unteroffizier and Fahnenjunker

16 April 1915: Appointed as Fahnrich

25 June 1915: Commissioned as Leutnant

Duty assignments
22 November 1914: Began service in the ranks of the 103rd Infantry Regiment

1 January 1915: Promoted to lead an infantry platoon and company

2 August 1915: Assigned to staff duty as an Ordnance Officer with 244th Reserve Infantry Regiment

20 March 1916: Detached for pilot training with 5th Flying Replacement Battalion and at the Military Flying School at Halberstadt

2 September 1916: Assigned to pilot's duty with Jagdstaffel 38

4 November 1916: Advanced training with 7th Flying Replacement Battalion, Cologne

21 November 1916: Assigned to Jagdstaffel 20 as a pilot

24 June 1917: Hospitalized with wound in the Naval Hospital in Bruges

15 July 1917: Posted to training and inspection duties

17 August 1917: Transferred to pilot's duty with Kest 3

5 September 1918: Appointed as Staffelführer to command Jagdstaffel 3

List of aerial victories
See also Aerial victory standards of World War I

Between the World Wars

Promotions and appointments
1 April 1925: Promoted to oberleutnant

1 February 1930: Promoted to hauptmann

1 April 1935: Promoted to major

1 March 1937: Promoted to oberstleutnant

1 June 1939: Promoted to oberst

Duty assignments
29 November 1918: Demobilization duties with 6th Flying Replacement Battalion, Jagdstaffel 5

1 June 1919: Pilot with Saxony's Artillery Flying Squadron Großenhain

1 October 1919: Seconded to Airbase Großenhain

8 May 1920: Assigned to ground duty as technical officer with Light Motor Vehicle Column 4

1 October 1920: Platoon leader with Motor Transport Battalions

1 April 1925: Began weapon technology studies at the Technical Studies College Dresden, which led to his Diploma in Engineering, awarded 21 March 1932

1 April 1932: Assigned as advisor in the Army Weapons Office

1 April 1933: Posted to staff duty with various motor transport battalions

1 April 1935: Transferred into the Luftwaffe as Battery Chief of the Flak Bataillon Lubeck

15 March 1936: Director of the Luftwaffe's Test Site in Rechlin

1 December 1936: Staff duty with Fighter Group I/137 at Bernburg

1 March 1937: Appointed to command Fighter Group I/137

World War II

Promotions and appointments 
1 October 1943: Promoted to Generalmajor

Duty assignments 
1 June 1939: Assigned to command the 71st Flying Training Regiment

27 May 1940: Tasked as Airport Area Commandant, Jessau/Insterburg

1941: Served as Air Region Column Leader for the Netherlands

1942: Served as Air Region Column Leader for Italy and North Africa

1 July 1943: Assigned as Director of the travel staff with the Luftwaffe personnel office

1 April 1944: Transferred to reserves of the OKL

1 July 1944: Assigned to special duties with Air Region Command VI

28 February 1945: Retired from military service

Post World War II
Generalmajor Georg Weiner was detained by the victorious Russians in the aftermath of the War, and imprisoned in the Soviet Union on 5 October 1945. He was not released until 26 September 1949.

He died on 24 January 1957 in Göttingen, Germany.

Honors and awards
1914 Iron Cross first and second class

Pilot's Badge

Ritterkreuz second class Albrechts Order with Swords

Ritterkreuz service medal second class with swords

Black Wound Badge

Aviator's Commemorative Badge

Honor Cross for Combatants

Wehrmacht Long Service Award fourth to the first class

Africa Sleeve Band

References
 Above the Lines: The Aces and Fighter Units of the German Air Service, Naval Air Service and Flanders Marine Corps, 1914–1918. Norman Franks, Frank W. Bailey, Russell Guest. Grub Street, 1993. , .
 Fokker D VII Aces of World War 1, Part 2: Aircraft of the Aces 63: Osprey Aircraft of the Aces. Norman Franks, Greg VanWyngarden. Osprey Publishing, 2004. , .

Endnotes

1895 births
1957 deaths
Luftwaffe World War II generals
German World War I flying aces
Luftstreitkräfte personnel
Military personnel from Dresden
People from the Kingdom of Saxony
Recipients of the Iron Cross (1914), 1st class
Reichswehr personnel
Major generals of the Luftwaffe